The 1999–2000 Interliga season was the first season of the multi-national ice hockey league. Eight teams participated in the league, and EC KAC from Austria have won the championship.

Regular season

Play-offs

Quarter-finals

Semi-finals

Final

External links
Season on www.hockeyarchives.info

Interliga (1999–2007) seasons
Interliga
2
Inter